The Beach Boys is the 25th studio album by American rock band the Beach Boys, released on June 10, 1985. Produced by Steve Levine, the album is the band's first after the drowning of founding member Dennis Wilson. The album saw the band incorporate 1980's contemporary musical styles into their own sound and was intended to be a "comeback" for the band. It was also the band's first album to be recorded digitally and the last released by James William Guercio's Caribou Records.

Brian Wilson's psychologist Eugene Landy, who was originally awarded co-writing credits on Wilson's songs, stated in a contemporary interview, "I'm practically a member of the band ... Brian's got the talent to make the music. ... He's the creator. The other band members are just performers. So I'm the one who's making the album."

Reception

Critical reaction was mixed. Writing in Rolling Stone, Parke Puterbaugh called the album 'pretty entertaining', adding 'though not a world-beating act of artistic reassertion, the LP does serve to showcase those amazing voices, and to remind the world that nobody does it better — still.' Retrospectively, Levine said that he remained "immensely proud" of the album and wished that it had sold better.

Track listing
Eugene Landy originally received co-writer's credit for all Brian Wilson compositions. This credit was omitted on later editions.

Personnel
Credits adapted from the 2000 CD liner notes.

The Beach Boys
 Al Jardine – vocals, electric guitar
 Bruce Johnston – vocals, Kurzweil 250
 Mike Love – vocals
 Brian Wilson – vocals, Yamaha DX 1, Jupiter 8, Oberheim OB8, piano
 Carl Wilson – vocals, Yamaha DX 1, electric guitar

Additional players

 John Alder – guitar, guitar synthesizer, dobro
 Graham Broad – percussion, drums
 Stuart Gordon – violin, viola, cello
 Steve Grainger – baritone saxophone, tenor saxophone
 Roy Hay – all instrumentation on "Passing Friend"
 Simon Humphrey – bass
 Judd Lander – harmonica
 Steve Levine – Fairlight CMI
 Julian Lindsay – Kurzweil 250, PPG Wave 2.3, Oberheim OB8, Yamaha DX 1, bass, organ, acoustic piano
 George McFarlaine – bass
 Kenneth McGregor – trombone
 Terry Melcher – Kurzweil 250
 Gary Moore – guitar, Synthaxe
 Ian Ritchie – tenor saxophone, Lyricon
 Dave Spence – trumpet
 Ringo Starr – drums and timpani on "California Calling"
 Stevie Wonder – drums, bass, Fender Rhodes, and harmonica on "I Do Love You"

Charts

References
Citations

Bibliography

External links

1985 albums
The Beach Boys albums
Capitol Records albums
Caribou Records albums
Albums produced by Steve Levine